Roman Zvonkov (2 July 1967 – 4 September 1995) was a Ukrainian biathlete. He competed in the men's 20 km individual event at the 1994 Winter Olympics.

References

1967 births
1995 deaths
Ukrainian male biathletes
Olympic biathletes of Ukraine
Biathletes at the 1994 Winter Olympics
Sportspeople from Yekaterinburg